Barbus lepineyi is a doubtfully distinct ray-finned fish species in the family Cyprinidae.

It is found only in Morocco. Its natural habitat is freshwater springs. It is not considered a threatened species by the IUCN.

The taxonomy and systematics of the Maghreb barbs are subject to considerable dispute. Some authors consider B. lepineyi a distinct species, while others include it in the Algerian barb (Luciobarbus callensis), or L. pallaryi.

References

L
Endemic fauna of Morocco
Fish described in 1939
Taxonomy articles created by Polbot
Taxobox binomials not recognized by IUCN